Ames is an unincorporated community in Union Township, Montgomery County, in the U.S. state of Indiana.

It is located within the city limits of Crawfordsville.

The community did not participate in the 2010 Census.

Geography

References

Unincorporated communities in Montgomery County, Indiana
Unincorporated communities in Indiana